Waikato District is a territorial authority of New Zealand, in the northern part of Waikato region, North Island.  Waikato District is administered by the Waikato District Council, with headquarters in Ngāruawāhia.

The district is centred to the north and west of the city of Hamilton, and takes in much of the northern Waikato Plains and also the Hakarimata Range. The north of the district contains swampy floodplain of the Waikato River and several small lakes, of which the largest is Lake Waikare.

Other than Ngāruawāhia, the main population centres are Huntly, Raglan, and Te Kauwhata. The main industries in the district are dairy farming, forestry, and coal mining. There is a major coal-fired power station at Huntly. Te Kauwhata is at the centre of a major wine region.

Demographics
At the 2006 census the district had a population of 43,959. Of these, 6834 lived in Huntly, 5106 in Ngāruawāhia, 2637 in Raglan, and 1294 in Te Kauwhata.

The largest census areas are shown in this table (in 2018 many area boundaries were altered, so not all are comparable with previous years, though the district remained unaltered) -

Waikato District had a population of 75,618 at the 2018 New Zealand census, an increase of 12,240 people (19.3%) since the 2013 census, and an increase of 18,030 people (31.3%) since the 2006 census. There were 24,918 households, comprising 38,169 males and 37,449 females, giving a sex ratio of 1.02 males per female. The median age was 37.6 years (compared with 37.4 years nationally), with 17,724 people (23.4%) aged under 15 years, 13,239 (17.5%) aged 15 to 29, 35,130 (46.5%) aged 30 to 64, and 9,525 (12.6%) aged 65 or older.

Ethnicities were 76.8% European/Pākehā, 26.4% Māori, 4.2% Pacific peoples, 5.8% Asian, and 1.8% other ethnicities. People may identify with more than one ethnicity.

The percentage of people born overseas was 15.9, compared with 27.1% nationally.

Although some people chose not to answer the census's question about religious affiliation, 53.9% had no religion, 33.2% were Christian, 1.8% had Māori religious beliefs, 1.0% were Hindu, 0.3% were Muslim, 0.5% were Buddhist and 1.9% had other religions.

Of those at least 15 years old, 10,611 (18.3%) people had a bachelor's or higher degree, and 11,277 (19.5%) people had no formal qualifications. The median income was $34,700, compared with $31,800 nationally. 11,421 people (19.7%) earned over $70,000 compared to 17.2% nationally. The employment status of those at least 15 was that 30,771 (53.2%) people were employed full-time, 8,640 (14.9%) were part-time, and 2,352 (4.1%) were unemployed.

History
Under the Local Government (Waikato Region) Reorganisation Order 1989 nearly all of Waikato County Council was added to the Boroughs of Huntly, Ngāruawāhia, most of Raglan County Council and a small part of Waipa County Council to form Waikato District Council.

The County Councils had lasted over a hundred years from their formation in 1876. They had been preceded by Highways Boards, formed from 1866. Prior to that there had been many complaints about Auckland Province spending a disproportionate amount in Auckland. For example, in 1867  27 Raglan settlers petitioned the House of Representatives asking it to replace provinces with local government and saying that, out of a £500,000 loan to the province, only £500 was spent in all the country districts.

Highways Boards
Auckland Province passed a Highways Act in 1862 allowing their Superintendent to define given areas of settlement as Highways Districts, each with a board of trustees elected by the landowners. Land within the boundaries of highway districts became subject to a rate of not more than 1/- an acre, or of 3d in the £ of its estimated sale value and that was to be equalled by a grant from the Province.

By a notice in the Provincial Government Gazette on 25 August 1866, the deputy Superintendent, Daniel Pollen, declared Whaingaroa Highway District, the first in the future Raglan County. A public meeting in the Raglan courthouse on 20 October 1866 was followed by a meeting a week later to elect 5 trustees. The largest landowner in the district, Captain Johnstone, was elected chairman, but he and 3 other trustees resigned after they couldn't collect rates from absent owners and the Province didn't pay anything.

Raglan Town Board was formed in 1868, Karioi Board in 1870 by division of Whaingaroa Highway District and by 1871 eleven board chairmen met in Ohaupo to ask for more government help. From 1872 government assistance more than matched rates collected; today government funding through NZTA mainly matches rates funding.

Raglan County Council
Under the Counties Act, 1876, in a NZ Gazette Supplement of Thursday, December 28, 1876, the Governor General set the first county council meetings at noon, Raglan County's being in The Resident Magistrate's Court, Raglan on Tuesday, 9 January 1877.

Raglan County was divided into five ridings (based on the distance a horse could travel in a day): Karioi, Pirongia, with 2 councillors each, and Te Akau, Onewhero and Whangape, with one. Only 3 of the Ridings were represented at the first meeting; W. H. Wallis (elected chairman) and John Pegler, Karioi Riding; James Sherrett, Pirongia; and Richard Robert Hunt, Onewhero. At the next meeting in Whatawhata there was only one other councillor present, from Pirongia. Many of the areas had not had Highway Boards and were sparsely populated (874 people in 175 houses across the whole county), so voters had problems getting together to nominate councillors. By 1887 there were 8 nominations for the 7 seats.

As population grew the original 5 ridings were split - Karamu from Pirongia (28 November 1889), Whaingaroa from Karioi 1902, Pukekawa from Onewhero and Port Waikato from Te Akau 1911, Pukemiro from Whangape 1913 and Waingaro from Te Akau 1920.

Some areas were transferred to neighbouring councils. The far south of Raglan went to Kawhia County when it was formed, but in 1952, the Local Government Commission put Makomako back in Raglan. On 1 October 1944, a coal-bearing area of Huntly West went to Huntly Borough. Other minor alterations were gazetted at intervals over the years. In 1954 a Raglan Town Committee was formed. Under the Local Government Act 1974, Raglan and Rotowaro became community towns, governed by elected councils.

The county relied on government grants until 1887, when government cuts forced it to set a rate. From 1889 to 1902 the Highways Boards were gradually merged into the County. Until 1943 each riding paid for its own roads and bridges, supplemented from council funds.

The northern portion of Raglan County was added to Franklin District in 1989, when the rest joined WDC.

Offices 
Raglan had also had a Town Board from 1883 to 1889 and from 1906 to 1938. Raglan Town Board had its offices in the Municipal Buildings in Raglan from their rebuilding in 1928, after a 1927 fire, until the Board again merged with the County.

From 1876 to 1888 Raglan County Council meetings were held in Raglan. However, Raglan wasn't central for the county, so meetings then alternated between Raglan and Whatawhata. On 15 May 1901 Raglan County held its first meeting in its new chambers at Ngāruawāhia, though continuing with at least an annual meeting in Raglan. In 1908 the council agreed to sell the old office for £227 10s. and build larger offices on the Raglan side of the Waipā Bridge. W. J. Smith of Raglan built them for £625. The new office opened in 1909. On 27 May 1961, a new £40,000, 16-room, brick building, on the Great South Road, was officially opened by the Minister of Works, Stanley Goosman. The old office was sold in 1961 and was being used as a loom factory, when it burnt down on 18 November 1971.

Community Boards 
Waikato District has 5 community boards covering Huntly, Ngāruawāhia and Raglan (formed 1989), Taupiri (added 1992) and Onewhero-Tuakau (added in 2010 covering part of the former Franklin District).

Community Committees 
The District also has 5 Community Committees for the townships of Meremere, Te Kauwhata (they had Community Boards from 1992 to 1995), and Tamahere ward, along with the North East Waikato Committee, covering Mangatawhiri, Mangatangi and Maramarua.

An extensive community master planning exercise was completed in 2019 resulting in adoption by Council of Community "BluePrints" to capture community aspirations and guide future development.

See also 
 Mayor of Waikato
 Waikato District Council

References

External links

 Waikato District official website
 Hamilton & Waikato Regional Tourism
 Huntly Town
 The Cyclopedia of New Zealand – Raglan County in 1902
 1906 Raglan County - Department of Lands and Survey maps - Map 3602%22 north and Map 3601%22 south
 1921 Raglan County boundaries